Mohamad Zaim bin Abu Hassan is a Malaysian politician from UMNO. He was the Member of Parliament of Parit from 2013 to 2018 and Member of Perak State Legislative Assembly for Belanja from 1995 to 1999 and from 2004 to 2013.

Politics 
He was dropped as a candidate in the 2018 Malaysian general election.

Election result

References 

Malaysian Muslims
United Malays National Organisation politicians
Members of the Dewan Rakyat
Members of the Perak State Legislative Assembly
Malaysian people of Malay descent
Living people
Year of birth missing (living people)